Robert Clarence Harder (June 4, 1929 – April 12, 2014) was an American politician and Methodist clergyman. He was the longest-serving cabinet secretary in Kansas history.

Born in Horton, Kansas, he received his bachelor's degree from Baker University, his master's degree in theology from Perkins School of Theology, and his doctorate degree from Boston University. Harder then served as pastor of a United Methodist Church. From 1961 to 1967, he served in the Kansas House of Representatives as a Democrat. He then served as Secretary of the Kansas Department of Social and Rehabilitation from 1967 to 1987, and later served as Secretary of the Department of Health and Environment. He died in Topeka, Kansas, of a brain tumor.

References

1929 births
2014 deaths
People from Horton, Kansas
Baker University alumni
Perkins School of Theology alumni
Boston University School of Theology alumni
Deaths from brain cancer in the United States
Deaths from cancer in Kansas
Neurological disease deaths in Kansas
Democratic Party members of the Kansas House of Representatives
State cabinet secretaries of Kansas
American United Methodist clergy
20th-century American politicians